Choi Jin-sung (born 1975) is a South Korean film director and screenwriter. Choi's works reveal aspects of Korean society that have been marginalized by the country's strong waves of economic development, including FuckUmentary (2001), Camellia Project (2005), Reservoir Dogs Take 1: South-han River (with Windy City) (2010), Reservoir Dogs Take 2: Nakdong River (with Bard & Jung Mina) (2011) and Jam Docu GANGJEONG (2011).

He also directed the documentary film I AM (2012) which follows 32 SM Town K-pop artists on their journey to become the first Asian singers to stage their milestone SMTown Live '10 World Tour concert at Madison Square Garden in New York and the romance/mystery thriller Steel Cold Winter (2013) starring Kim Yoon-hye and Kim Shi-hoo.

Filmography 
FuckUmentary (documentary, 2001) - director, cinematographer
The World Cup of Their Own ver. 2.0 (short film, 2002) - director, cinematographer, planner, editor
For Whom The Gun Tolls (short film, 2003) - director, editor
Hitchhiking (short film, 2004) - director, screenwriter
Independent Film Maker's Project To Abolish The National Security Law (documentary, 2004) - director, editor
Catch Me If You Can (short film, 2004) - director
Erotic Chaos Boy (documentary, 2005) - director, screenwriter, cinematographer, production director, editor, actor
Camellia Project (2005) - director, screenwriter, editor
Dasepo Naughty Girls (2006) - screenwriter
Into the Breeze (documentary, 2008) - actor
Project 320 (documentary short, 2009) - director
Reservoir Dogs Take 1: South-han River (with Windy City) (short film, 2010) - director
Reservoir Dogs Take 2: Nakdong River (with Bard & Jung Mina) (short film, 2011) - director
Lee-Sang's strange reversible reaction (short film, 2011) - director
Jam Docu GANGJEONG (documentary, 2011) - director, actor
I AM (documentary, 2012) - director
Steel Cold Winter (2013) - director, script editor, actor
The Plan (documentary, 2017) - director
The Reservoir Game (documentary, 2017) - director
Cyber Hell: Exposing an Internet Horror  (documentary, Netflix; 2022) - director

References

External links 
 
 
 

1975 births
Living people
South Korean film directors
South Korean screenwriters
Place of birth missing (living people)